Double anglers are a family, Diceratiidae, of anglerfishes. They are found in deep, lightless waters of the Atlantic, Indian and western Pacific Oceans.

They are easily distinguished from other anglerfishes by their possession of a second light-bearing dorsal fin spine immediately behind the illicium (the bioluminescent lure present in other anglerfishes).

As in other anglerfishes, the male is very much smaller than the female, and after a larval and adolescent free-living stage, spends the rest of his life parasitically attached to a female.

Species in this family are known almost entirely from adolescent females; only two larvae, one adult female, and one adult male have been found.

The first specimen of the two-rod anglerfish (first called Ceratias bispinosus) was collected during the expedition of  during 1873–1876. It was first described by Albert Günther in 1887 in volume 22 of "Report on the deep-sea fishes collected by H. M. S. Challenger during the years 1873–76. Report on the Scientific Results of the Voyage of ADD"

Species
The six species in two genera are:
 Genus Bufoceratias
 Bufoceratias shaoi Pietsch, Ho & Chen, 2004
 Bufoceratias thele Uwate, 1979
 Bufoceratias wedli Pietschmann, 1926
 Genus Diceratias
 Diceratias bispinosus Günther, 1887 (Two-rod anglerfish)
 Diceratias pileatus Uwate, 1979
 Diceratias trilobus Balushkin & Fedorov, 1986

See also
 List of fish families

References

Diceratiidae
Deep sea fish